Earthquake Bird is a 2019 psychological thriller film written and directed by Wash Westmoreland based on the 2001 novel of the same name by Susanna Jones. It stars Alicia Vikander, Riley Keough, Naoki Kobayashi and Jack Huston.

It had its world premiere at the BFI London Film Festival on October 10, 2019. It was released on November 1, 2019, before digital streaming on November 15, 2019, by Netflix.

Plot summary
Set in 1989 Tokyo, Japan, Lucy Fly (Alicia Vikander) is a young Swedish female immigrant who is working as a translator at a manufacturing company, and is suspected of murder when her friend Lily (Riley Keough) goes missing in the wake of a tumultuous love triangle with Teiji Matsuda (Naoki Kobayashi).

The plot of the film is interspersed with flashbacks of Lucy's childhood, as well as scenes of her romantic relationship with Teiji and friendship with Lily Bridges, an American expatriate. Teiji's hobby includes taking photographs of people, particularly women. Teiji would eventually start a sexual relationship with Lucy and later with Lily.

During a vacation to Sado Island, Lucy's friendship with Lily sours when she discovers that Teiji has begun a romantic relationship with Lily behind her back. Following the disappearance of Lily, Lucy is arrested and interrogated by Japanese detectives. Lucy claims that she murdered Lily in a fit of jealous rage, but is cleared after the body is identified as belonging to someone else. After being released, Lucy discovers evidence in Teiji's photo collection implicating him in Lily's murder and disappearance. Teiji attacks Lucy but she kills him in self-defense.

The film ends with Lucy in a cemetery with her Japanese friend Natsuko (Kiki Sukezane), reflecting on the past.

Cast
Alicia Vikander as Lucy Fly
Riley Keough as Lily Bridges
Naoki Kobayashi as Teiji Matsuda
Jack Huston as Bob
Kiki Sukezane as Natsuko
Ken Yamamura as Oguchi
Yoshiko Sakuma as Yamamoto
Akiko Iwase as Ms. Kato

Production
In August 2016, it was announced Wash Westmoreland would write and direct the film, based upon novel of the same name by Susanna Jones.  Michael Schaefer, Michael Pruss, Ann Ruark, Georgina Pope will produce the film, while Ridley Scott will serve as an executive producer on the film, under their Scott Free Productions and Twenty First City banners, respectively, with Amazon Studios originally set to distribute. In March 2018, Alicia Vikander and Riley Keough joined the cast of the film, with Netflix distributing. In April 2018, Jack Huston joined the cast of the film. In May 2018, Naoki Kobayashi joined the cast of the film, with production beginning that same month, in Tokyo. Sado Island was also used as a filming location.

Release
It had its world premiere at the BFI London Film Festival on October 10, 2019. It was released on November 1, 2019, in a limited release before digital streaming on November 15, 2019.

Reception
The website's critical consensus reads, "Riley Keough and Alicia Vikander give it their all, but Earthquake Bird suffers from a frustrating inability to bring its literary source material consistently to life." On Metacritic, the film holds a rating of 48 out of 100, based on 10 critics, indicating "mixed or average reviews".

References

External links

2019 films
American drama films
American psychological thriller films
British drama films
2019 psychological thriller films
Films based on British novels
Films set in 1989
Films set in Tokyo
Films scored by Atticus Ross
Films shot in Tokyo
English-language Netflix original films
Scott Free Productions films
Japan in non-Japanese culture
Japanese-language Netflix original films
2010s American films
2010s British films